Shin Bo-Me (also spelled Shin Bo-Mai) was a principal queen of four kings of Ava in the early 15th century.

Brief
Considered a great beauty, Bo-Me was the favorite queen of Minkhaung I. Although the Hmannan Yazawin chronicle states she became the chief queen of Minkhaung in 1407/08, an inscription dated 28 February 1409 by Queen Shin Saw states that Saw was still the chief queen in 1409. She was also the favorite queen of Minkhaung's son and successor Thihathu until Shin Saw Pu became queen. In August 1425, Bo-Me engineered the death of Thihathu by getting Le Than Bwa of Onbaung to assassinate the king. She might have married the successor, eight-year-old Min Hla. Three months later, she poisoned the boy king and put her lover Prince Min Nyo on the Ava throne, and became the chief queen. In May 1426, Nyo was overthrown by Gov. Thado of Mohnyin, who subsequently made Bo-Me a junior queen.

Ancestry
The following is her ancestry as given in the Hmannan Yazawin chronicle. She was a granddaughter of King Swa Saw Ke of Ava, and Kyawswa I of Pinya, and a great granddaughter of King Thihathu of Pinya and King Kyawswa of Pagan.

Notes

References

Bibliography
 
 
 
 

Chief queens consort of Ava
14th-century Burmese women
15th-century Burmese women